Hoërskool Eldoraigne is a public Afrikaans medium co-educational high school situated in the suburb of Eldoraigne in Centurion in the Gauteng province of South Africa, it is one of the top and most academic schools in Gauteng and its learners are known as Eldo's.

History 
Situated on the corner of Christopher street and Dordrecht street, Eldoraigne was founded in 1974 as an Afrikaans secondary school.

Frank Roos
Mr Frank Roos became the headmaster in 1996 and served in that position up to his retirement, 19 years later. Roos was formerly a teacher at HTS Witbank (1973-), department head at Hoërskool Ben Viljoen in Groblersdal, vice principal at Hoërskool Verwoerdburg (current Hoërskool Centurion), and senior vice principal at Hoërskool Gerhard Maritz. Mr Roos majored in Entomology as student, and Biology remained his favourite subject subsequently. He was a writer of text books for the Education Department, served on its biology research committee, and served as head examinator for the National Education Department. Mr Roos was succeeded in 2015 by Dr Anton Prinsloo.

Dr Anton Prinsloo
At the time of his appointment Prinsloo expressed the hope that the school's brand could be improved from "fifth" to first place nationally, but his tenure was noted for heightened tensions and a very high turnover of staff. Prinsloo was previously a teacher at Hoërskool Vorentoe (87-88) and Hoërskool Helpmekaar (89-), before he served as vice principal at Hoërskool Riebeekrand and Hoërskool Noordheuwel (-98) respectively. By 1997 he had obtained his M.Ed. and D.Ed. from RAU, and was headmaster at Hoërskool Bastion from 1998 to 2014.

In April 2018 an Eldoraigne pupil paid Hoërskool Waterkloof a visit, intending to ask a Waterkloof girl to his prom dance. The visit however devolved into a scuffle between the boy and two of Waterkloof's staff members, and Prinsloo's office subsequently informed the media that the boy was "not enrolled at the school since the incident". In 2021 the Gauteng Education Department temporarily relieved Prinsloo of his duties at Eldoraigne, after fellow staff accused him of victimization and bullying, and some parents allegedly signed a petition to remove him. His deputy, Mr Dave du Plessis, was appointed as acting principal during his three months long absence. When the Department moved to charge Prinsloo with misconduct, his accusers however decided to "stand their ground" by refusing to testify in a disciplinary hearing. The department consequently dismissed their complaints, and reinstated Prinsloo in his former position. Prinsloo resumed his duties on August, 17th, and claimed that he was inundated with messages in support. A week later some 40 parents and pupils however gathered to hand over a petition to the South African Teacher’s Union (SAOU) which was signed by hundreds of respondents. They expressed their concern and dissatisfaction with Prinsloo's return, and the impact they believed it would have on staff and pupils. The school's governing body indicated that it was reserving its options, before the Department relented and once again recalled Prinsloo.

National history 
SA Schools Rugby
 1 learner in 2016

Provincial history 
Blue Bulls Rugby Union invites:
 10 learners in 2007
 5 learners in 2008
 4 learners in 2009
 3 learners in 2010

Ranking 
Eldoraigne was rated as the best secondary school in Gauteng. It also gained number one on Homecoming Revolution

Headmasters 
The headmasters (up to 2021) were:
 Mr Frank Roos (19962015)
 Dr Anton Hugo (Dok) Prinsloo (20152021)
 Mr Dave du Plessis (2021)
 Dr Anton Hugo (Dok) Prinsloo (2021)

Communication 
Eldoraigne has a weekly newsletter called Eldo Info which contains the school's highlights of the week. It also contains a letter for the students written by the principal, invitations to social events, weekly sports results, upcoming sport matches, and opportunity for extra tutoring classes.

Sport 
Hoërskool Eldoraigne encourages its students to take part in any form of sport they are interested in, although this doesn't count for extra credit. Types of sport done at the school include

Academics 

Academic pass rates for grades 8 through 11 for the past ten years.

 2004 - 98.2%
 2005 - 98.2%
 2006 - 98.2%
 2007 - 98.1%
 2008 - 98.1%
 2009 - 97.9%
 2010 - 98.1%
 2011 - 98.5%
 2012 - 98.7%
 2013 - 96.6%

The pass rates for matric has been 100% for the first 9 years and 99.68% for 2013.
Matric pass rates:
 2016 - 100%
 2017 - 100%
 2018 - 100%

Events 
Hoërskool Eldoraigne has multiple cultural events learners can participate in including

Facilities include:

Notable alumni 

List of Hoërskool Eldoraigne matriculants are in alphabetical order:
 Pierre Joubert (Class of 1996) South African professional cricketer 
 Robbie Coetzee (Class of 2007) South African professional rugby player 
 Stephan Lewies (Class of 2010) South African professional rugby player 
 Natasha Joubert (Class of 2015) South African model
 Shayne Bolton (Class of 2018) South African professional rugby player

References 

Schools in Pretoria
Schools in Gauteng
Afrikaans-language schools